The 15th Cinemalaya Independent Film Festival was held from August 2–13, 2019 in Metro Manila, Philippines. A total of ten full-length features and ten short films competed. The festival was opened by the film Ang Hupa by Lav Diaz and its closing film was Mina-Anud by Kerwin Go.

Entries
The winning film is highlighted with boldface and a dagger.

Full-Length Features

Short films

Awards
The awards ceremony was held on August 12, 2019, at the Tanghalang Nicanor Abelardo (CCP Main Theater), Cultural Center of the Philippines.

Full-Length Features
 Best Film – John Denver Trending by Arden Rod Condez
 Special Jury Prize – Edward by Thop Nazareno
 Audience Choice Award – Belle Douleur (A Beautiful Pain) by Atty. Joji V. Alonso
 Best Direction – Eduardo Roy Jr. for Fuccbois
 Best Actor – Jansen Magpusao for John Denver Trending
 Best Actress – Ruby Ruiz for Iska
 Best Supporting Actor –  Ricky Davao for Fuccbois
 Best Supporting Actress – Ella Cruz for Edward
 Best Screenplay – Mary Rose Colindres for Iska
 Best Cinematography – Rommel Sales for John Denver Trending
 Best Editing – Benjo Ferrer III for John Denver Trending
 Best Sound – Immanuel Verona for Iska
 Best Original Music Score – Len Calvo for John Denver Trending
 Best Production Design – Alvin Francisco for Edward
 NETPAC Award – John Denver Trending by Arden Rod Condez

Short films
 Best Short Film: "'Wag Mo 'Kong Kausapin (Please Stop Talking)" by Josef Gacutan
 NETPAC Award: "Disconnection Notice" by Glenn Averia
 NETPAC Award Special Mention: "Sa Among Agwat" by Don Senoc
 Special Jury Award: "Tembong" by Shaira Advincula
 Special Mention for Subject Matter: "Hele ng Maharlika" by Norvin delos Santos
 Audience Choice: "Heist School" by Julius Renomeron Jr.
 Best Screenplay: "Kontrolado ni Girly and Buhay N'ya" by Gilb Baldoza
 Best Director: "Sa Among Agwat" director Don Senoc

References

External links
Cinemalaya Independent Film Festival

Cinemalaya Independent Film Festival
Cine
Cine
2019 in Philippine cinema